A chronic scar keratosis   is a precancerous skin lesion that arises within a long-standing scar.

References 

Epidermal nevi, neoplasms, and cysts
Scarring